Cloridarol (or clobenfurol) is a vasodilator.

References 

Benzofurans
Vasodilators
Chloroarenes
Secondary alcohols